Rob Hill is a music producer and engineer as well as a songwriter and musician, based in Los Angeles California.
Rob's production credits include: Everlast (musician), Korn, Soul Assassins, Xzibit, Wu-Tang Clan, Cypress Hill, Queen,  Jackson Browne, the Cars, R.E.M.,  Zayra Alvarez, Northern State, Fuel (band), "Skinhead " Rob Aston, Psycho Realm, Tim Armstrong, Molotov (band), Depswa, Tourettes (band), Transplants (band), and many more...

Rob Hill worked with Elliot Scheiner on a 5.1 remix of the great R.E.M. classic "Document", where he was the digital engineer, and editor. Album includes "End of the World" and "The One I Love". He also worked on the surround remix of the 1st the Cars record "Cars"with hits like "My Best Friend's Girlfriend" and "Just What I Needed" where Rob recaptured the tracks in original producer Roy Thomas Baker's Arizona Studio from his Stevens 40 track 2" tape machine.

Rob has worked with some of the biggest names in music production, e.g. Phil Ramone, Elliot Scheiner, Greg Ladanyi, Frank Fillapetti, Michael Beinhorn, Ed Cherney, etc...

discography 
2002: A Night at the Opera (Queen album) [DTS] by Queen 2002: Untouchables [Bonus DVD] by Korn 2003: Dust by DJ Muggs 2003: Leave the Light On (Beth Hart album) by Beth Hart 2003:	Natural Selection by Fuel (band) 2003: Take a Look in the Mirror [Bonus DVD] by Korn2003: Take a Look in the Mirror [Clean] by	Korn 2003: Take a Look in the Mirror by Korn2004: 1st Infantry (album) [Clean] by The Alchemist (producer) 2004: 1st Infantry (album) by The Alchemist (producer) 2004: All City [Clean] by Northern State (band) 2004: All City 	by Northern State (band) 2004: Found by Todd Proctor2004: Greatest Hits, Vol. 1 [Clean] by Korn2004: 	Greatest Hits, Vol. 1 by Korn2004: Ruleta [2004] by Zayra Alvarez 2004: Till Death Do Us Part (Cypress Hill album)  [Clean] by Cypress Hill 2004: Till Death Do Us Part (Cypress Hill album)  by Cypress Hill2004: What's Your Number? [CD 2] by Cypress Hill2004: White Trash Beautiful [Import CD] by	Everlast (musician)2004: White Trash Beautiful by Everlast (musician)2005: 1st Infantry (album) [Deluxe] by	The Alchemist (producer)2005: 1st Infantry (album) [Instrumental] by The Alchemist (producer) 2005: Grandmasters (album) by DJ Muggs/GZA the Genius2005: Greatest Hits from the Bong [Clean] by	Cypress Hill 2005: Greatest Hits from the Bong by Cypress Hill 2005: A Night at the Opera (Queen album)[30th Anniversary CD/DVD] by Queen (band)2005: Running on Empty (album) [Expanded Edition] by Jackson Browne2005: S.P.I.T. by	Supernatural 2005: Urban Survival Syndrome by Mitchy Slick2006: Grandmasters (album): Instrumentals by DJ Muggs/GZA the Genius2006: Ruleta [2006] by Zayra Alvarez2007: Grandmasters (album) Remix by DJ Muggs/GZA2007: Treason Songs by Tourettes (band)2008: Alienigma [Bonus Track] by Agent Steel2008: Etched in Blood by	The Dreaming2011: Kiss of Death by Mignon (musician)2012: Na Chasti by Lumen (band)2012: Beast For Love by Dance Hall Pimps (band)

References

External links
 
 
 

American audio engineers
American record producers
Living people
Year of birth missing (living people)